David Johnson (born 23 August 1944) is a former English cricketer.  Johnson was a right-handed batsman.  He was born in Dowsby, Lincolnshire.

Johnson made his debut for Lincolnshire in the 1965 Minor Counties Championship against Shropshire.  Johnson played Minor counties cricket for Lincolnshire from 1965 to 1967, which included 15 Minor Counties Championship appearances.  He made his List A debut against Hampshire in the 1966 Gillette Cup. In this match he scored 16 runs, before being dismissed by Alan Wassell.  He played a further List A match against the same opposition in the 1967 Gillette Cup.  Opening the batting, he was dismissed for 7 runs by Derek Shackleton.

References

External links
David Johnson at ESPNcricinfo
David Johnson at CricketArchive

1944 births
Living people
Cricketers from Lincolnshire
People from South Kesteven District
English cricketers
Lincolnshire cricketers